Pethia muvattupuzhaensis is a species of cyprinid fish found in Muvattupuzha and Periyar Rivers, Kerala, India.  It is sometimes considered conspecific with Pethia punctata. Day, 1865  This species can be found over sand or gravel substrates. This species reaches a length of  SL.

References

Pethia
Fish described in 2005